Swank Creek is a stream in the U.S. state of Indiana.

The origin of the namesake Swank is obscure.

See also
List of rivers of Indiana

References

Rivers of Kosciusko County, Indiana
Rivers of Wabash County, Indiana
Rivers of Indiana